The Clarke, later Clarke-Travers later, Clarke  Baronetcy, of Crosses Green in the County of Cork, was a title in the Baronetage of the United Kingdom. It was created on 28 June 1804 for William Clarke. The second Baronet assumed the additional surname of Travers in 1853. The 3rd baronet was succeeded by his cousin Edward Henry St Lawrence Clarke, the son of Rev. John William Clarke, sixth and youngest son of the 1st baronet.

Clarke, later Clarke-Travers, later Clarke baronets, of Crosses Green (1804)
Sir William Clarke, 1st Baronet (1762–1808)
Sir William Henry St Laurence Clarke-Travers, 2nd Baronet (1801–1877)
Sir Guy Francis Travers Clarke-Travers, 3rd Baronet (1842–1905)
Sir Edward Henry St Lawrence Clarke, CMG, DSO, 4th Baronet (1857–1926)

See also
Clarke baronets

References

Extinct baronetcies in the Baronetage of the United Kingdom